St. Ignatius Plaza is a shopping center in Luzhou District, New Taipei, Taiwan, that opened on March 2, 2012. It is the first and largest shopping mall in the district. The main core stores of the mall include UNIQLO, Muji and various themed restaurants. There is a MRT connection channel on level B2 connecting to St Ignatius High School metro station.

Floor Guide

Gallery

See also
 List of tourist attractions in Taiwan

References

External links

2012 establishments in Taiwan
Shopping malls in New Taipei
Shopping malls established in 2012